Solaria may refer to:

Solaria (fictional planet), a fictional planet in Isaac Asimov's novel The Naked Sun
Solaria (magazine), an Italian literary magazine 1926–1936
Solaria (plant), a genus of South American plants

See also
Solarium (disambiguation)
Solar (disambiguation)
Solarian